The Welsh Courts Act 1942 is an Act of the Parliament of the United Kingdom that allowed the Welsh language to be used in courts in Wales and Monmouthshire provided that the person speaking would be under a disadvantage in having to speak English.

Section 1 of the Act repealed section 17 of the Laws of Wales Act 1536 and stipulated that the Welsh language may be used in any court in Wales by any party or witness who considers that he would otherwise be at any disadvantage by reason of his natural language of communication being Welsh.

Section 2 of the Act allowed oaths and affirmations to be taken in Welsh with like effect as with English.

Section 1 of the Act was repealed by the Welsh Language Act 1967, which extended the right to use Welsh in legal proceedings to any person who wished to do so, and the rest by the Welsh Language Act 1993 which made Welsh an official language of Wales.

See also 

 Welsh Language Act 1967
 Welsh Language Act 1993

 National Assembly for Wales (Official Languages) Act 2012
 Welsh Language (Wales) Measure 2011

References 

1942 in law
1942
1942
Acts of the Parliament of the United Kingdom concerning Wales
United Kingdom Acts of Parliament 1942
History of Monmouthshire
Language policy in the United Kingdom